Tomtor is the name of several rural localities in the Sakha Republic, Russia:
Tomtor, Megino-Kangalassky District, Sakha Republic, a selo in Tomtorsky Rural Okrug of Megino-Kangalassky District
Tomtor, Oymyakonsky District, Sakha Republic, a selo in Borogonsky 2-y Rural Okrug of Oymyakonsky District
Tomtor, Tattinsky District, Sakha Republic, a selo in Bayaginsky Rural Okrug of Tattinsky District
Tomtor, Ust-Aldansky District, Sakha Republic, a selo in Myuryunsky Rural Okrug of Ust-Aldansky District
Tomtor, Borulakhsky Rural Okrug, Verkhoyansky District, Sakha Republic, a selo in Borulakhsky Rural Okrug of Verkhoyansky District
Tomtor, Dulgalakhsky Rural Okrug, Verkhoyansky District, Sakha Republic, a selo in Dulgalakhsky Rural Okrug of Verkhoyansky District